Novaya Bakhmetyevka is a rural locality (a selo) in Alexandrovskoye Rural Settlement, Zhirnovsky District, Volgograd Oblast, Russia. The population was 92 as of 2010.

Geography 
Novaya Bakhmetyevka is located on the right bank of the Medveditsa River, 17 km north of Zhirnovsk (the district's administrative centre) by road. Bolshaya Knyazevka is the nearest rural locality. A vacant church building sits near the east border.

References 

Rural localities in Zhirnovsky District